Rajarajeshwari Nagar, officially Rajarajeshwari Nagara is a residential neighborhood in Bangalore, Karnataka, India. It is located in the southwestern part of Bangalore along the Mysore Road, with Nagarbhavi and the Bangalore University to the north and north west and Kengeri to the south west. There is a prominent arch shaped structure on Mysore Road which serves as the most popular entrance to this locality.

The area was named after Jnanakshi Rajarajeshwari Temple which is located in the Rajarajeshwari Nagar. The locality has plenty of greenery and has contributed to many rallies and protests regarding the nature. Ideal Homes, BEML Layout, BHEL Layout, Krishna Garden, Halagevaderahalli, Kenchenahalli, Pattanagere, Gattigere, Channasandra and Ganakal are some of the sublocalities within Rajarajeshwari Nagar.

Culture
The Karnataka Chitrakala Parishath is set to open a 14-acre campus in Rajarajeshwari Nagar by 2020.

The neighbourhood is known for its vigilance against garbage dumping. Residents of the locality have formed a volunteer group called "Swachh RR Nagar" to clear garbage from public places in the area. In 2019, BBMP installed CCTV cameras in the locality to monitor and curb garbage dumping.

Residents of RR Nagar also ensure that the ban on plastic is enforced in the neighbourhood by donating paper covers and cloth bags to vendors. The locality reportedly became "plastic-free" in mid 2019.

Global Village Tech Park 

The Global Village Tech Park, spread over 120 acres, is located in Rajarajeshwari Nagar. A number of companies' offices are present in the Park. The headquarters of IT services firm Mindtree is also located there.

Notable residents
 Darshan
 Ganesh
Rakshit Shetty
 Diganth
 Amulya
Duniya Vijay
 Avinash
 Malavika Avinash
 Indrajith Lankesh
 B. Jayashree
 Nivedita Jain
 Gauri Lankesh
 Siddalingaiah

Educational institutions
BET(BEML Education Trust) Convent
BGS group of Institutions-CBSE
Shri Jnanakshi Vidyaketan
Global academy for learning
National Public School
National Hill View Public School
Panchasheela school and college
R. V. College of Engineering
 RNS Institute of Technology
 JSSATE
 SJB Institute of Technology
 Global Academy of Technology
 Sri Jnanakshi Vidyaniketan
 Sri Rajeshwari Vidyashala
Lalith Castle International School -CBSE

References

External links 

Neighbourhoods in Bangalore